AXFS (Advanced XIP Filesystem) is a compressed read-only file system for Linux, initially developed at Intel, and now maintained at Numonyx. It was designed to use execute in place (XIP) alongside compression aiming to reduce boot and program load times, while retaining a small memory footprint for embedded devices. This is achieved by mixing compressed and uncompressed pages in the same executable file. AXFS is free software (licensed under the GPL).

Cramfs is another read-only compressed file system that supports XIP (with patches); however, it uses a strategy of decompressing entire files, whereas AXFS supports XIP with page granularity.

See also 

 Squashfs is another read-only compressed file system
 Cloop is a compressed loopback device module for the Linux kernel
 e2compr provides compression for ext2
 List of file systems
 Comparison of file systems

References

Further reading 
 Tony Benavides, Justin Treon, Jared Hulbert and Weide Chang, The Enabling of an Execute-In-Place Architecture to Reduce the Embedded System Memory Footprint and Boot Time, Journal of Computers, Vol. 3, No. 1, Jan 2008, pp. 79–89
 Jared Hulbert, Introducing the Advanced XIP File System, (talk) Proceedings of the 2008 Linux Symposium

External links
 AXFS website
 Justin Treon (February 14, 2008) Side by side comparison of launching applications stored in the AXFS, SquashFS, CRAMFS and JFFS2 read-only filing systems. (video)
 "Application eXecute-In-Place (XIP) with Linux and AXFS"

Free special-purpose file systems
Compression file systems
Read-only file systems supported by the Linux kernel